Kris Di Angelis (better known by his stage name KDA) is a house music producer and DJ from London. He is best known for his 2015 song "Rumble", which was first released on Ministry of Sound, but was subsequently reworked featuring vocals from Tinie Tempah and Katy B titled "Turn the Music Louder (Rumble)".

Career
Known for his work in LGBT clubs, Kris Di Angelis started making remixes to play. In 2010, through a contract with Sony Music, became the official DJ of London Fashion Week. To reach a larger audience, he began to hide his identity and decided to use his initials as a pseudonym.

On 16 October 2015, KDA released his debut single "Turn the Music Louder (Rumble)", the song features vocals from Tinie Tempah and Katy B. The song premiered on Annie Mac's radio show as the "Hottest Record in the World" on 2 September 2015, and it was BBC Radio 1's Track of the Day on 30 September 2015. On 19 October 2015, the song was at number one on The Official Chart Update in the UK. On 23 October 2015, the song entered the UK Singles Chart at number one, making it KDA and Katy B's first number one single in the UK and Tinie Tempah's seventh number one. "Turn the Music Louder (Rumble)" has now gone Gold in the UK and sold over 400,000 units. In 2018, KDA assumes its identity again.

Discography

Singles

Remixes

Notes

References

External links
 KDA on Facebook
 KDA on Twitter

Living people
English people of Italian descent
DJs from London
English record producers
English house musicians
Electronic dance music DJs
Year of birth missing (living people)